Manichitrathazhu is a 1993 Indian Malayalam-language psychological thriller film directed by Fazil, written by Madhu Muttam, and produced by Swargachitra Appachan. The film stars Mohanlal, Suresh Gopi and Shobana with Nedumudi Venu, Innocent, Vinaya Prasad, K.P.A.C.Lalitha, Sridhar, K.B. Ganesh Kumar, Sudheesh, and Thilakan in supporting roles. The story is inspired by a tragedy that happened in an Ezhava tharavad of  Alummoottil meda' a old (Traditional house) located at Muttom (near Haripad ), a central Travancore Channar family, in the 19th century.

Directors Sibi Malayil, Priyadarshan and Siddique–Lal served as the second-unit directors. The cinematography was by Venu, and Anandakuttan and Sunny Joseph served as the second-unit cinematographers, the film was edited by T. R. Shekar. The original songs featured in the movie were composed by M. G. Radhakrishnan, while the original score was composed by Johnson. The film won the National Film Award for Best Popular Film Providing Wholesome Entertainment and Shobhana was awarded the National Film Award for Best Actress for her portrayal of Ganga / Nagavalli.

The film dealt with an unusual theme which was not common in Indian cinema at the time. The film completed 300 days of run in many theatres. Manichitrathazhu was remade in four languages – in Kannada as Apthamitra which in turn was remade in Tamil as Chandramukhi , in Bengali as Rajmohol and in Hindi as Bhool Bhulaiyaa – all being commercially successful. Geethaanjali, a spin-off directed by Priyadarshan and Mohanlal reprising the role of Dr. Sunny Joseph was made in 2013. Manichitrathazhu is considered by many critics as one of the best films ever made in Malayalam cinema and developed a cult following in the years after its release.

Plot 

Years ago, Nakulan's uncle, Thampi, wanted him to marry his daughter Sreedevi. Nakulan's mother, Sharadha, rejected the proposal as Sreedevi's horoscope was an ominous one. Later Nakulan falls in love with Ganga and they get married. Sreedevi is also married, but her marriage ends up in a divorce.

In the present day, Ganga and Nakulan arrive at their hometown from Kolkata. Thampi learns that Nakulan has decided to stay at the family mansion named Madampalli, despite all attempts to dissuade them. The couple moves in with the help of the family including Thampi's wife and children, Thampi's sister Bhasura, her husband Unnithan, and their daughter Alli.

Later Bhasura reveals the reason why everyone fears the mansion. About 150 years ago, Sankaran Thambi Karanavar, the then head of the family traveled to Thanjavur in Tamil Nadu, where he met and bought a dancer named Nagavalli, who was in love with another dancer named Ramanathan. Ramanathan came in search of her and stayed in a cottage next to the palace and met him secretly. When the Karanavar discovered this, he killed Nagavalli on a night in her room named Thekkini. Nagavalli's soul tried to take her revenge by taking the form of a witch and kill him, but he chanted some mantras and neutralized the ghost. The Karanavar with the help of various priests and sorcerers tamed the ghost by locking it up in Thekkini situated at the southwest corner of the house on a Durgashtami. The Karanavar committed suicide shortly afterwards by consuming poison, and his soul too got trapped in Thekkini. Since then, her soul was roaming around Madampalli on the night.

In the present day, Alli and Mahadevan (a college professor) are in love, and their marriage is fixed. Listening to Nagavalli's story, Ganga thinks that it was fabricated to scare thieves from stealing treasures in the room. So, Ganga gets the room key's duplicate from Alli and opens the room. She is scolded by Sreedevi, for the locksmith and the man who gave the key to Alli, have both been bedridden.

Subsequently, strange things begin to happen in the household; apparitions of a woman frighten the people in the house, things inexplicably break, and Ganga's sari catches fire during the day. The needle of suspicion falls on Sreedevi, who is generally found to be gloomy. Nakulan immediately calls up his psychiatrist friend Dr. Sunny from the United States to solve the case. As soon as Sunny arrives, an unknown person tries to kill Alli by locking her up in a storeroom. Sunny also foils  an attempt to kill Nakulan by poisoning. He hears a  mysterious voice singing in Tamil every night from Nagavalli's room. Impersonating the Karanavar by wearing his sandals and using his staff, he converses with the mysterious voice, who reveals herself as Nagavalli and vows revenge on the coming Durgashtami.

Ganga mysteriously disappears during a Kathakali Night. Sunny notices her absence and searches for her, and with Nakulan's help finds Ganga, who is apparently being harassed by Mahadevan.

After the confusions settle, Sunny reveals to Mahadevan and Nakulan that all the problems in the house are orchestrated by Ganga, who suffers from split personality disorder. Sunny tells them that Ganga who frequently transforms into Nagavalli's personality tried to kill Alli and Nakulan (who impersonates the Karanavar) and frame Mahadevan for sexual harassment by Nagavalli's alter ego. Mahadevan impersonates her lover Ramanathan since the former stays at the same house Ramanathan did. By framing Mahadevan, Ganga's alter ego planned to stop his marriage to Alli and get him back. Now the only way to stop Nagavalli's influence on Ganga is to make her believe that she killed her enemy Karanavar on Durgashtami.

Thampi calls in a renowned tantric expert, Brahmadathan Namboothiripad to solve the family's menace. To everyone's surprise, Sunny and Brahmadathan are long-time friends and they discuss the matter deeply as Sunny makes a rather unconventional plan to cure Ganga. Before carrying out his plan, Sunny asks Nakulan to provoke Ganga to see for himself whether she turns into the Nagavalli spilt persona or not. When Nakulan does so, she transforms into her Nagavalli persona, which shocks him. A worried Nakulan shouts at Ganga, turning her back to normal.

On Durgashtami night, Sunny and Brahmadathan allow Nagavalli to behead Nakulan posing as the Karanavar. Brahmadathan suddenly blows smoke and ash on Ganga's face when she is given a sword to kill Nakulan. Simultaneously Sunny turns a part of the platform over to let Nakulan escape, and a lifeless dummy of the Karanavar gets sliced instead. Convinced that her enemy is dead, Nagavalli leaves Ganga's body, permanently curing her.

The family bids farewell to Ganga, Nakulan, and Sunny. Sunny expresses his desire to marry Sreedevi before leaving, for which she responds with a smile.

Cast 

 
 Mohanlal as Dr. Sunny
 Suresh Gopi as Nakulan
 Shobana as Ganga Nakulan and Nagavalli (voiceover by Bhagyalakshmi and Durga.)
 Nedumudi Venu as Thampi
 Vinaya Prasad  as Sreedevi, Thampi's daughter
 Sridhar as Mahadevan (Dancer Ramanathan in Ganga's hallucination)
 Sudheesh as Chandhu
 Innocent as Unnithan
 K. P. A. C. Lalitha as Bhasura
 Thilakan as Pullattuparam Brahmadathan Namboothiripad
 Kuthiravattam Pappu as Kattuparamban
 K. B. Ganesh Kumar as Dasappan Kutty
 Rudra as Alli
 Vaijayanthi as Jayasree 
 Kuttyedathi Vilasini as Thampi's wife

Production

Filming 
The haunting Thekkini was created inside the Vasan House in Chennai, the house of late S. S. Vasan, the founder of Gemini Studios. It was one of the film’s key locations apart from Padmanabhapuram Palace and Hill Palace. 
The climax scene and major parts of the film were filmed in Padmanabhapuram Palace and Hill Palace, Tripunithura. The painting of Nagavalli was made by artist Shri R. Madhavan, drawn without a live model.

Dubbing credits 
Shobana's voice was dubbed by two dubbing artistesBhagyalakshmi and Durga. Bhagyalakshmi dubbed her voice for Ganga, while Durga gave voice to the character's alter-ego, Nagavalli. Nagavalli's voice is heard only in the minor part of the film compared to Ganga's. Durga was not credited in the film or its publicity material and until 2016, the popular belief was that Bhagyalakshmi solely dubbed both voices.

In January 2016, in an article Ormapookkal published by Manorama Weekly, Fazil revealed that initially Bhagyalakshmi dubbed for both Ganga and Nagavalli, but during post-production, some of the crew, including editor Shekar, had a feeling that both voices sounded somewhat similar even though Bhagyalakshmi tried altering her voice for Nagavalli. Since Nagavalli's dialogue are in Tamil language, Fazil hired Tamil dubbing artist Durga for the part. But he forgot to inform it to Bhagyalakshmi, hence she was also unaware of it for a long time. Fazil did not credit Durga in the film; according to him, it was a difficult to make changes in the titles at that time, which was already prepared and her portion in the film was minor. The credits included only Bhagyalakshmi as the dubbing artiste for Shobana. Other dubbing artistes were Anandavally and Ambili, who dubbed for Vinaya Prasad and Rudra.

Soundtrack 

The soundtrack for the film was composed by M. G. Radhakrishnan which went on to become one of the most popular film albums in Malayalam. The album consists of nine tracks. The lyrics sung are in Malayalam and Tamil written by Bichu Thirumala and Madhu Muttam for Malayalam and Vaali for Tamil.

Release 
Manichitrathazhu was released on 25 December 1993, and performed well at the box office, becoming the highest-grossing Malayalam film ever, to that date. It ran for more than 365 days in some centres. The film had a collection of 7 crore.

Awards

Legacy 
Manichitrathazhu is considered as a classic and is hailed as one of the best films ever made in Malayalam cinema. The film has consistently fetched maximum ratings for its television screenings. Even twenty years after its release it has been screened more than 12 times a year on an average on Kerala's leading TV channel, Asianet. The film has received the maximum TRP rating on every screening; TRP ratings have increased every year, a rare record for a film produced in Kerala. For many Malayalis, Manichitrathazhu is a part of their cultural lives.

In a 2013 online poll in India by IBN Live, Manichitrathazhu was voted second among India's Greatest Films, by audience. The poll was conducted as part of the celebration of Indian cinema completing 100 years. The poll constituted a list of 100 films from different Indian languages. A saree featuring Shobhana in a song scene from this film was released in the market as the Nagavali saree.

One of the most memorable or defining scenes of the movie where Nakulan provokes Ganga to transform into the Nagavalli persona was recreated in later Malayalam films like Om Shanti Oshana.

Remakes

Spin-off 
A spin-off titled Geethaanjali was released on 14 November 2013, directed by Priyadarshan with Mohanlal reprising his role as Sunny in lead role and Suresh Gopi reprised his role as Nakulan but in a cameo appearance.

See also 
 Dissociative identity disorder
 Identity formation
 List of Malayalam horror films
 Mental illness in film

References

External links 
 

1990s Malayalam-language films
1993 films
Films scored by M. G. Radhakrishnan
Best Popular Film Providing Wholesome Entertainment National Film Award winners
Films about exorcism
Films directed by Fazil
Films featuring a Best Actress National Award-winning performance
Indian films based on actual events
Indian ghost films
1990s psychological horror films
1990s ghost films
Indian psychological horror films
GNagavalli1
Malayalam films remade in other languages